Nancy Ellen Garapick (born September 24, 1961) is a former Canadian competition swimmer, Olympic medallist, and former world record-holder.  She won two bronze medals in the 100-metre backstroke and 200-metre backstroke at the 1976 Summer Olympics in Montreal at the age of 14, behind two East German athletes, Ulrike Richter and Birgit Treiber, who later were confirmed to be longstanding participants of the East German doping scandal of the 1970s."She set a new Olympic record for the 100-metre backstroke during heats.

Garapick's Olympic performances came on the heels of her world record performance on April 27, 1975 at the Eastern Canadian Swimming Championships in Brantford, Ontario, while a member of the Halifax Trojan Aquatic Club and coached by Nigel Kemp. It was there that she set a new World Record in the 200m backstroke with a time of 2:16:33 at the age of 13.

In 2008, she was inducted into Canada's Sports Hall of Fame.  The official ceremony took place November 5, 2008, in Toronto, Ontario.

In 2018 she was named one of the greatest 15 athletes in Nova Scotia's history.

See also
 List of Olympic medalists in swimming (women)
 List of World Aquatics Championships medalists in swimming (women)
 World record progression 200 metres backstroke

References

External links
  (archive)
 Nancy Garapick at Nova Scotia Sport Hall of Fame (archive)
 
 
 
 
 

1961 births
Living people
Canadian female backstroke swimmers
Canadian female butterfly swimmers
Canadian female freestyle swimmers
Canadian female medley swimmers
World record setters in swimming
Olympic bronze medalists for Canada
Olympic bronze medalists in swimming
Olympic swimmers of Canada
Sportspeople from Halifax, Nova Scotia
Swimmers at the 1976 Summer Olympics
Swimmers at the 1979 Pan American Games
World Aquatics Championships medalists in swimming
Medalists at the 1976 Summer Olympics
Pan American Games silver medalists for Canada
Pan American Games bronze medalists for Canada
Pan American Games medalists in swimming
Medalists at the 1979 Pan American Games